The 1916 Detroit Tigers football team  was an American football team that represented the University of Detroit in the 1916 college football season. In its second season under head coach Harry Costello, the team compiled a 3–2–2 record and outscored its opponents by a combined total of 98 to 38.

Schedule

References

Detroit
Detroit Titans football seasons
Detroit Tigers football
Detroit Tigers football